Thomas Frederick Dalton-Morgan,  (23 March 1917 – 18 September 2004) was a fighter pilot and flying ace of the Royal Air Force during the Second World War. He flew during the Battle of Britain, and is counted amongst the ranks of 'The Few'.

Early life
Dalton-Morgan was born in Cardiff, Wales, on 23 March 1917 and attended Taunton School.

RAF career
On 21 October 1935, he accepted a short service commission with the Royal Air Force (RAF) in the rank of acting pilot officer (on probation), and trained as a pilot, being confirmed as a pilot officer on 26 August 1936. He was promoted to flying officer on 26 April 1938 and was later sent to join No. 22 Squadron RAF, flying the Vickers Vildebeest torpedo bomber. He was later seconded to war at the Air Ministry in London.

In April 1940 Dalton-Morgan applied to return to flying, and was promoted to flight lieutenant on 26 April. He was then appointed to No. 43 Squadron RAF ("The Fighting Cocks") as a flight commander in June 1940. With minimal fighter experience as a fighter pilot he flew Hawker Hurricanes from RAF Tangmere (part of No. 11 Group RAF).

Battle of Britain
Dalton-Morgan's first 'kill' came on 12 July 1940 when he shared in the downing of a Heinkel He 111 bomber.

On 13 August 1940, the Luftwaffe began Operation Eagle Attack, which the Oberkommando der Luftwaffe (OKL) began a major effort to destroy RAF Fighter Command in southern England. At 06:25, Dalton-Morgan was scrambled with 43 Squadron to support 64, 87 and 601 Squadrons. The RAF formations intercepted 20 Junkers Ju 88s from I. and 18 Ju 88s from II./Kampfgeschwader 54. They were escorted by V.(Z)./Lehrgeschwader 1. The German objective was to attack RAF Odiham and RAF Farnborough. No. 43 Squadron intercepted the Germans between Guildford and Brighton. Dalton-Morgan attacked a Ju 88 from the stab staffel, perhaps piloted by Oberleutnant Kurt Erdmann. He damaged the rudder and engine but was struck by return fire or became the victim of one of the escorting fighters; possibly Unteroffizier Walter Gerigk. Both the Ju 88 and Hurricane crashed and the German crew were captured by a local policeman. Dalton-Morgan had taken off without properly changing because of the rapid scramble, and he had difficulty and convincing the local constabulary he was not a member of the German crew.

Quickly returning to his squadron, Dalton-Morgan was soon flying combat sorties and shot down four more enemy aircraft over the next three weeks. In early September 1940 he added three Messerschmitt Bf 109s fighters to his tally. On 6 September he again came worse off in combat with Bf 109s and he was wounded in the face and knee and was forced to crash land his Hurricane.

Distinguished Flying Cross (DFC) was gazetted on 6 September 1940:

Once more returning to No. 43 Squadron on 7 September, Dalton-Morgan now took over command and relocated the squadron to Northumberland to refit with new fighters and to train replacement pilots.

Pilot trainer
Following the end of the Battle of Britain in October 1940, Dalton-Morgan concentrated on passing on his experience to new pilots. He also worked on developing the Hurricane fighter into a night-fighter with great success. He soon accounted for six further 'kills' flying his Hurricane at night. One of his most successful periods was over the nights of the 6 and 7 May 1941 when he shot down three Luftwaffe bombers over Glasgow. He was promoted to temporary squadron leader on 1 June.

On 8 June he shot down a Junkers Ju 88 and two further 'kills' followed. On 24 July he intercepted another Ju 88 off May Island. Despite his engine starting to fail he pressed home his attack and downed the enemy bomber. His engine then completely quit and he was forced to land on the water, a highly dangerous exercise. He was later picked up by the Royal Navy.

For this attack he received a Bar to his DFC on 31 May 1941:

On 2 October 1941 he shot down another bomber, off Berwick-on-Tweed. Finally, in February 1942, Dalton-Morgan was rested with a tally of at least 14 aircraft shot down and several damaged.

Distinguished Service Order
After a short period working as a fighter controller at RAF Turnhouse, near Edinburgh, he was promoted to temporary wing commander on 1 June 1942, and promoted to squadron leader (war-substantive) on 26 August. He returned to operations in late 1942 to become leader of the Ibsley Wing. Commanding eight fighter squadrons, Dalton-Morgan organised long-range offensive sorties and bomber escort duties over northern France. He damaged an Bf 109 in December 1943, and then shot down a Focke Wulf 190 fighter and damaged another during a sweep over the French port of Brest. He was awarded the Distinguished Service Order on 25 May 1943:

4th Fighter Group
Dalton-Morgan's bomber escort experience saw him attached to the 4th Fighter Group of the US 8th Air Force and flew over 70 combat sorties with the group. Promoted to wing commander (war-substantive) on 12 December 1943, he served as operations officer with the 2nd Tactical Air Force.

In the buildup to the Normandy Landings he was part of the planning team organising the roster of ground targets. Shortly before the end of the war, he learned his brother John had been killed after being shot down in a de Havilland Mosquito.

Post war
After the war he remained in Germany with 2nd Tactical Air Force. He was promoted to the substantive rank of squadron leader on 1 September 1945 and attended the RAF staff College, becoming a senior instructor at the School of Land/Air Warfare. Promoted to wing commander on 1 July 1947, he commanded the Vickers Vampire equipped Gutersloh Wing before taking command of RAF Wunstorf. He resigned from the RAF on 4 April 1952 with the rank of wing commander.

On leaving the RAF, Dalton-Morgan joined the joint UK/Australian weapons testings facility, at Woomera, which he managed for the next 30 years before retiring in Australia.

In January 1945 he was appointed an Officer of the Order of the British Empire and mentioned in despatches in 1946, the same year he also received the US Bronze Star Medal.

He was exposed as committing bigamy ten days after receiving promotion as group captain.

References
Citations

Bibliography 

 Bergström, Christer (2015). The Battle of Britain: An Epic Conflict Revisited. Oxford: Casemate. .

1917 births
2004 deaths
Military personnel from Cardiff
Companions of the Distinguished Service Order
Recipients of the Distinguished Flying Cross (United Kingdom)
Royal Air Force group captains
Shot-down aviators
Royal Air Force pilots of World War II
The Few
British World War II flying aces
British emigrants to Australia